Esbu Kola-ye Karim Kola (also Romanized as Esbū Kolā-ye Karīm Kolā) is a village in Emamzadeh Abdollah Rural District, Dehferi District, Fereydunkenar County, Mazandaran Province, Iran. At the 2006 census, its population was 377, in 94 families.

References 

Populated places in Fereydunkenar County